Nikolai Sergeyevich Tarasov (born 25 February 1998) is a Russian football player who currently plays for Qizilqum Zarafshon in the Uzbekistan Super League

Club career
He made his debut in the Russian Football National League for FC Veles Moscow on 10 July 2021 in a game against FC Yenisey Krasnoyarsk.

References

External links
 
 Profile by Russian Football National League

1998 births
People from Kirovsky District, Leningrad Oblast
Sportspeople from Leningrad Oblast
Living people
Russian footballers
Association football defenders
FC Zenit-2 Saint Petersburg players
FC Amkar Perm players
FC Olimp-Dolgoprudny players
FC Torpedo Vladimir players
FC Veles Moscow players
FC Atyrau players
Russian First League players
Russian Second League players
Kazakhstan Premier League players
Russian expatriate footballers
Expatriate footballers in Kazakhstan
Russian expatriate sportspeople in Kazakhstan